Matheus Aiás Barrozo Rodrigues (born 30 December 1996), known as Matheus Aiás, is a Brazilian professional footballer who plays as a forward for Racing Santander of the Spanish Segunda División.

Club career

Early years
Born in Palmares Paulista, São Paulo, Matheus played in the youth teams at Cruzeiro and Ponte Preta. In January 2014 he agreed to a deal with Italian Serie A side Udinese from Ponte Preta's under-17 squad. He was later assigned to Granada CF, a club in the same ownership group as Udinese in Giampaolo Pozzo, joining their reserve team in November 2014 but could only be registered the following January after he turned 18. Matheus made his senior debut on 15 March 2015, playing the last 12 minutes in a 0–1 Segunda División B away loss against Arroyo CP. His first goal came on 4 October 2015, as he scored the opener in a 1–1 home draw against Mérida AD.

On 27 April 2017, Matheus joined fellow third division side Lorca FC on loan for two months, as an injury replacement to Chumbi, helping the team win promotion to the Segunda División via the playoffs for the first time in the team's history.

In July 2017, now owned by Watford, another club of the Pozzo ownership family, Matheus returned to the Spanish third division on loan with CF Fuenlabrada. 

On 30 January 2018, Matheus was loaned to Valencia CF Mestalla.

Mirandés
On 22 August 2018, Matheus agreed to a one-year loan deal with fellow third division CD Mirandés, achieving promotion at the end of the 2018–19 season. His loan was renewed for a further season as the team entered LaLiga 2. He made his professional debut on 17 August, starting in a 2–2 away draw against Rayo Vallecano. During the team's run to the 2019–20 Copa del Rey semi-finals, Matheus finished as the competition's second-highest scorer behind Alexander Isak and became the first player in a decade to score against four different La Liga opponents for a team in a lower division after netting against Celta Vigo, Sevilla, Villarreal and Real Sociedad. Only Lionel Messi and Luis Suárez had done so in that time.

Orlando City
On 21 August 2020, Matheus signed a two-and-a-half-year deal with MLS side Orlando City. After a two-month delay, Matheus was eventually able to make his debut on October 24 as a stoppage-time substitute in a 2–1 defeat to Inter Miami. He scored his first goal for the club in the following game, a 4–1 rivalry win against Atlanta United.

Having only played for a combined 31 minutes for Orlando City, Matheus returned to the Spanish Segunda División on loan with Real Oviedo on 4 July 2021 ahead of the 2021–22 season with an option to buy. He made his Oviedo debut on 20 August 2021, as a 67th-minute substitute in a 2–1 defeat to Almería.

Racing Santander
On 8 July 2022, it was announced Aias had moved to newly-promoted Segunda División team Racing Santander for an undisclosed transfer fee.

Career statistics

References

External links

Matheus Orlando City profile

1996 births
Living people
Footballers from São Paulo (state)
Brazilian footballers
Association football goalkeepers
Segunda División players
Segunda División B players
Major League Soccer players
Club Recreativo Granada players
Lorca FC players
CF Fuenlabrada footballers
Valencia CF Mestalla footballers
CD Mirandés footballers
Orlando City SC players
Real Oviedo players
Racing de Santander players
Brazilian expatriate footballers
Brazilian expatriate sportspeople in Spain
Expatriate footballers in Spain
Brazilian expatriate sportspeople in the United States
Expatriate soccer players in the United States